Magu District is one of the seven districts of the Mwanza Region of Tanzania, East Africa. Its administrative centre is the town of Magu on the Simiyu River.
It is bordered to the north by Lake Victoria and Busega District, to the east by Bariadi District, to the south by Itilima District, Maswa District, Kwimba District and Misungwi District, and to the west by the city of Mwanza, which consists of Nyamagana District and Ilemela District.

As of 2012, the population of Magu was 299,759.
This is less than the district's population in 2002, when the number was 416,113, due to the fact that the district was split up in 2012 and about half of the original Magu district is now part of the new Busega District, Simiyu Region.

Administrative subdivisions

Constituencies
For parliamentary elections, Tanzania is divided into constituencies. As of the 2010 elections Magu District had two constituencies:
 Busega Constituency
 Magu Constituency

Divisions
, Magu District was administratively divided into four divisions: 
 Itumbili
 Kahangara
 Ndagalu
 Sanjo

Wards
As of 2002, Magu District was administratively divided into twenty-seven wards.  As of 2012, it was divided into 18 wards having undergone considerable reorganisation.

2002 wards
The twenty-seven wards in 2002:

 Badugu
 Bujashi
 Igalukilo
 Kabita
 Kahangara
 Kalemela
 Kiloleni
 Kisesa
 Kitongosima
 Kongolo
 Lubugu
 Lutale
 Magu Mjini
 Malili
 Mkula
 Mwamabanza
 Mwamanga
 Mwamanyili
 Ngasamo
 Ng'haya
 Nkungulu
 Nyaluhande
 Nyanguge
 Nyigogo
 Shigala
 Shishani
 Sukuma
 Lugeye
 Kitongo
 Ngashe
 Ilungu

2012 wards

 Bujashi
 Bukandwe
 Jinjimili
 Kahangara
 Kisesa
 Kitongo Sim
 Kongolo
 Lubugu
 Lutale
 Magu Mjini (Magu town)
 Mwamabanza
 Mwamanga
 Ng'haya
 Nkungulu
 Nyanguge
 Nyigogo
 Shishani
 Sukuma

Notes

Districts of Mwanza Region